IA8 may refer to:

 Iowa's 8th congressional district
 Iowa Highway 8

fr:IA8